Barbara Dégi (born 29 November 1983 Budapest) is a Hungarian volleyball player.

She competed at the 2011 Women's European Volleyball League, and 2019 Women's European Volleyball League.

She played for Vasas Budapest, which were Hungarian Women's Volleyball League champions in 2005, and 2008. She competed at the Hungarian Beach Volleyball Championship.

Clubs

References 

Hungarian women's volleyball players
1983 births
Living people